Willie Dixon was a Chicago blues artist, perhaps best known for his songwriting.  He wrote or co-wrote over 500 songs and his work has been recorded by some of the best-known blues musicians of his era, including Muddy Waters, Howlin' Wolf, and Little Walter. Later, some of his songs were popularized by rock groups, such as the Rolling Stones, Cream, and Led Zeppelin.  Musicians in several genres have interpreted Dixon's songs.

Footnotes

Citations

Specific references

General references

Songs written by Willie Dixon
Dixon, Willie
Blues songs
American rhythm and blues songs